Sayanna Varthakal is a 2022 Indian Malayalam-language black comedy crime film co-written and directed by Arun Chandu and produced by D14 Entertainments. Co-written by Sachin R. Chandran and Rahul Menon, the film stars Gokul Suresh and newcomer Sharanya Sharma in lead roles. 

The music of the film is composed by Prashant Pillai and Sankar Sharma, while the cinematography is handled by Sarath Shaji. It is reported that the movie tells the tale of a film actor and his life in a government-affiliated organisation. The film was released theatrically on 5 August 2022.

Cast 
 Gokul Suresh as Ravi Kumar
 Dhyan Sreenivasan as Dennis Varghese
 Aju Varghese as Jithu Joseph
 Sharanya Sharma as Sithara
 Dinesh Prabhakar as Pavithran
 Indrans as Raghavan
 Irshad as Rajeev
 Vijayaraghavan as Varghese, Dennis' father
 Makarand Deshpande as Mangesh Pandey
 Vishnu Govindan as Lazar
 Anand Manmadhan as Anand
 Jeril Varghese as Jerry
 Radhadevi as Oviya

Production 
Sayanna Varthakal is the directorial debut of Arun Chandu who was a former associate of director Vineeth Sreenivasan. During an interview to The New Indian Express Arun said, "Sayanna Varthakal is a media-related story and the title is actually a reference to the title of the media channel run by Dennis (Dhyan Sreenivasan). Gokul Suresh plays the character Ravi Kumar, a government employee who crosses paths with Dennis." Sayanna Varthakal began its principal photography in late June 2018, and it was shot in various locations, including Ernakulam, Kolkata and Nepal border.

Soundtrack 
The film features original background score and songs composed by Prashant Pillai.

References

External links
 
 

Indian black comedy films
2020s Malayalam-language films
Indian political satire films
Films shot in Kochi
Films shot in Kolkata
Films shot in Nepal
Indian crime comedy films